A Yank in Ermine is a 1955 British comedy film directed by Gordon Parry and starring Peter Thompson, Noelle Middleton, Harold Lloyd Jr. and Diana Decker, and featuring Jon Pertwee and Sid James. It was adapted by John Paddy Carstairs from his own novel Solid! Said the Earl. It was shot at Beaconsfield Studios and on location around Turville in Buckinghamshire. The film's sets were designed by the art director Ray Simm. The film includes the song "Honey, You Can't Love Two", sung by Decker and written by Eddie Pola and George Wyle.

Plot
An American airman (Thompson) inherits from a distant cousin the title of Earl and a house and estate in an English village. Although he is initially reluctant, his fiancé (Decker) encourages him to accept it, after she hears how much the estate is worth. When he arrives in England with his two buddies (Pertwee and Lloyd Jr.), he falls for the daughter (Middleton) of the owner of the neighbouring estate - but she is also engaged to be married.

Cast
Peter Thompson as Joe Turner 
Noelle Middleton as Angela
Harold Lloyd Jr. as Butch
Diana Decker as Gloria
Jon Pertwee as Slowburn
Reginald Beckwith as Kimp
Edward Chapman as Duke of Fontenham
Richard Wattis as Boone
Guy Middleton as Bertram
Harry Locke as Clayton
 Alan Gifford as Col. M'Gurk
 Joanna Gay as 	Mabel
Jennifer Jayne as Enid
Patrick Connor as Orderly
 George Woodbridge as 	Landlord
 Alice Bowes as Shopkeeper
 Stewart Mitchell as Sentry
 John McLaren as 	Corporal
Sid James as Nightclub Manager
 George Hilsdon as	Alf Lewis
 Aileen Lewis as 	Dancer in Nightclub

Critical reception
In the Radio Times, David Parkinson wrote "What few bright moments there are come from the late Jon Pertwee, who, fittingly, made his film debut in A Yank at Oxford, and Harold Lloyd Jr, the son of the silent screen legend."

References

External links

1955 films
1955 comedy films
British comedy films
Films directed by Gordon Parry
Films based on British novels
Films shot at Beaconsfield Studios
1950s English-language films
1950s British films
English-language comedy films